Sem is a masculine given name. The Dutch name is the Biblical Shem (son of Noah) and perhaps sometimes a variant of the West Frisian name Sjamme.  People with the name include:

Sem Benelli (1877–1949), Italian playwright, essayist and librettist
Sem Braan (born 1979), Dutch kickboxer
Sem De Ranieri (1888–1979), Italian sports shooter
Sem Dresden (1881–1957), Dutch conductor, composer, and teacher
 (1914–2002), Dutch literary critic, Romance linguist and essayist
 (1912–1995), Dutch engraver and graphic designer
Sem Moema, British politician
Sem Robberse (born 2001), Dutch baseball player
Sem Sæland (1874–1940), Norwegian physicist
Sem Schilt (born 1973), Dutch kickboxer
Sem Shilimela (born 1991), Namibian wrestler
Sem Vermeersch (born 1968), Belgian Koreanist
Sem de Wit (born 1995), Dutch footballer

See also
Sem (artist), pseudonym of French caricaturist Georges Goursat (1863–1934)
Sem (disambiguation)

References

Dutch masculine given names